Glan, officially the Municipality of Glan, is a 1st class municipality in the province of Sarangani, Philippines. According to the 2020 census, it has a population of 109,547 people.

Glan is located east of Sarangani Bay, west of Davao Occidental, and north of the Celebes Sea. Barangay Sufatubo as the largest barangay in Glan, It is largely based on agriculture with a high level production of copra. Aquaculture is the second biggest income earner, notably milkfish and shrimps culture. Other agricultural products are coconuts, maize, sugarcane, bananas, pineapples, mangoes, pork, eggs, beef, and fish.

The economy accelerated in 2010s due to advances in global communication technology and the finishing of a modern highway, which improved trade and transport. The municipality is classified as he "heritage town" by cultural conservationists, including members of the National Commission for Culture and the Arts due to the many well-preserved ancestral houses and heritage structures within the municipality. The Heritage Conservation Society suggested an ordinance, similar to the ordinance in Vigan, that would protect Glan's heritage houses and aesthetics in 2014 for centuries to come. Some conservationists have also suggested for the town's inclusion in the Philippines tentative list for UNESCO World Heritage Site enlistment.

History

In the early efforts of Independence from American administration, Sergio Osmeña Sr. the president of the first convention of provincial governors had joined those nationalists who petitioned Governor William Howard Taft to allow the formation of a political party advocating immediate independence for the Philippines in 1902. 
Sergio Osmeña while governor of Cebu, he was elected as the first Speaker of national assembly in 1907 then, uses the venue to request further more Filipino control in the colony or “Filipinozation” of the colony.
From year 1907 to 1916, the executive power of the Philippines was vested in an American Governor General, assisted by the departmental secretaries.
Under the Osmeña Act, which passed by the Philippine Legislature a portion of this act “Which provides the colonization to all parts of Mindanao that includes Jolo, Sulo and Basilan.”
Hence, the distribution of land in Mindanao, program by the bureau of land “Free” otherwise known as “Homestead”, comprises twenty four (24) hectares track of agricultural land in addition to townsite lot of nine hundred twenty (920) square meters.
To give free and distributed to Filipino families from all walks of life from Luzon, Visayas and all parts of the archipelago willing to owned and occupy land in Mindanao.
Hence, this was known as “SACADA” people migrated to Mindanao by way of shipment from Luzon and other parts of the Visayas.

Year 1912. Arriving at the port of Surigao (North of Mindanao) where the office of the bureau of land under American supervision. A noticed outside the office which read “Immediate Hiring of Workers” and willing to travel to all parts of Mindanao. Thus, this young Elpidio Empasis Barcelona, a very poor young Spanish Filipino mestizo hails from Tanke, Talisay in island of Cebu at the age of sixteen (16) became an employee of the Bureau of Land, under an American supervision in Land Survey Party. His category works as a “Transit man”, he was designated as an assistance to the Engineering Land Surveyor due to his mathematical know how. Experienced in surveying, first assignment from Butuan, Davao, and others parts of Cotabato, Pikit, Pagalungan, Midsayap as far as Zamboanga, Jolo, Sulo and Basilan.
Same year 1912, back to area of Cotabato member of survey party lead by American geodetic engineer, continued their task of surveying, until they reached the most southern part of Cotabato, now called “GLAN”.
In 1912, the place was unexplored. The existing of the biggest form of trees with approximate diameter of five to six feet, the least was four feet in diameter. Very few existing houses of native inhabitants called “Bla’ans” and “Muslims”. Only not more than seven houses or shanties near the banks of the river, there are also others who lived in shanties at the hinterland. They found no Christians alike, the place was still unknown its name.
A member of the survey party, approached a certain native who happened sharpening his long bladed bolo or kris the ethnic weapon then, and asked the native in Cebuano dialect “Amigo, unsay nga’an ning dapita, ning lugaraha?” (Friend, what's the name of this area, this place?) The native did not actually understand Cebuano dialect, he the native thought the stranger was asking what he was doing. The native answered “GALANG” means sharpening. Then and there, the member of the survey party reported to young Elpidio Empasis Barcelona the name of the place is “Galang”. By mistake, it was named in the surveyed place and was established in the department of agriculture in a lot plan as “Colony No. 9- Glan”. The native man was later known as Po Mangalaw.

This young Elpidio Empasis Barcelona an assistant surveyor, made a written request to his American supervisor and recommended to the Bureau of Land Secretary to be reassigned in Cotabato colony no. 9 to assist SACADA people from Visayas in filing their free-patent application, relative to distribution and location of their homestead and also with corresponding lot number.
Elpidio Empasis Barcelona request's was granted. On ground that this new unexplored land (Colony No. 9) must be distributed to people Christians alike and also includes the native Bla’ans and Muslims.

Elpidio Empasis Barcelona wrote a letter to his families back in Carcar cebu, inviting them and their neighbors to come and the people from San Fernando, Naga, and other parts of Cebu joined in going to a place now called Glan. These people from Carcar and neighboring towns in Cebu decided themselves by majority to charter another ship, that directly to land at its seashores at the valley of Glan. The arrival of first ship landed was on October 8, 1914... They were
Fermin Adarna,	Braulio Jimenez,
Gavino Avila,	Severino Maribosa,
Esperidion Cania,	Agapito Morales,
Perpetuo Cellona,	Luis Onin,
Macario Ebona,	Mamerto Del Pilar,
Bernabe Flores,	Jose Sarcon,
Felipe Onay,	Tomas Ugdamin,
Damaso Intig,	Eulogio Villaluz.

then, the second batched was on March 10, 1915. They were Gil Alcober,	Gonzalo Cabilao,
Primo Alcoriza,	Braulio Calinawan,
Baldomero Alducente,	Gil Caliza,
Gaspar Alido,	Mateo Du,
Urbano Alinsunurin,	Felipe De Goma,
Macario Alinsugay,	Anatalio Flores,
Graciano Algarme,	Eusebio Lapis,
Maximo Baclaan,	Clemente Pangalao,
Andres Barcelona,	Eugenio Pangalao,
Enrique Barcelona,	Higino Paras,
Arcadio Baring,	Miguel Reyes,
Francisco Bendigoza,	Hospicio Sarmiento,
Marcelo Bukog,	Timoteo Sarmiento,
Mariano Alinsugay,	Gavino Tabanao,

These were the first Sacadas who built the town Glan. Later, Mr. Tranquilino Ruiz was assigned as Colony Supervisor around year 1917 in Glan.

Heritage Town
The municipality is classified by members of the National Commission for Culture and the Arts as a heritage town. However, no ordinance or law has yet to be legislated for protection of Glan's heritage structures and colonial roads. A Vigan-type ordinance has been suggested by the Heritage Conservation Society, so that the town may be added to the Philippines UNESCO Tentative List in the future.

Geography

Barangays
Glan is politically subdivided into 31 barangays.

Climate

Demographics

Economy

References

External links
Glan Profile at PhilAtlas.com
Glan Profile at the DTI Cities and Municipalities Competitive Index
Glan Municipal Profile at the Province of Sarangani Official Website
[ Philippine Standard Geographic Code]
Philippine Census Information
Local Governance Performance Management System 

Municipalities of Sarangani